NGC 4733 is a barred lenticular galaxy located about 55 million light-years away in the constellation of Virgo. NGC 4733 was discovered by astronomer William Herschel on March 15, 1784. NGC 4733 is a member of the Virgo Cluster.

See also 
 List of NGC objects (4001–5000)
 NGC 4477
 NGC 4620

References

External links
 

Barred lenticular galaxies
Virgo (constellation)
4733
43516
7997
Astronomical objects discovered in 1784
Virgo Cluster